Gabby Gator is an animated cartoon character, an anthropomorphic alligator who appeared in several cartoons produced by Walter Lantz and distributed by Universal Pictures.

Gabby lives in the Okiedokie Swamp, which is a play on Lake Okeechobee and is near Cape Canaveral. Unfortunately for him, this place does not have many food options, and so always hungry Gabby is forced to attract the food (usually Woody Woodpecker) to his home and attempt to capture him with anything he might have at hand, including highly advanced technology. Though Gabby Gator is intelligent and crafty, Woody always escapes, usually leaving Gabby with his home destroyed. The strangest thing about Gabby Gator is that he seems to have a vast supply of carrots, which are useless for a carnivorous reptile.

Appearance
Gabby is an always hungry green alligator who has a yellowish-green stomach and snout, depending on the episode, wears a reddish-purple hat, also depending on the episode, wears a yellow vest, and has two fangs poking out of his muzzle. He speaks with a southern accent, similar to that of Hanna-Barbera's Huckleberry Hound.

History
Gabby Gator first appeared as "Ali Gator" in the 1958 short Everglade Raid. In that short, Gabby—or "Ali"—tries to cook Woody for lunch. "Ali" appeared again in 1959's Romp in a Swamp. Gabby's first official appearance under his definitive name was in Southern Fried Hospitality, when he hardly never ate and caught Woody to stave off his starvation.

Gabby did not become as famous as Woody's more renowned enemies such as Wally Walrus and Buzz Buzzard. His final theatrical appearance was in Greedy Gabby Gator in 1963. Ms. Meany more or less replaced him as the recurring villain of the moment.

Later appearance
Gabby Gator later appeared in The New Woody Woodpecker Show in the episode Corn Fed Up.

List of Gabby Gator's appearances
Everglade Raid (1958)
Romp in a Swamp (1959)
Southern Fried Hospitality (1960)
Gabby's Diner (1961)
Woody's Kook-Out (1961)
Rock-a-Bye Gator (1962)
Rocket Racket (1962)
Voo-Doo Boo-Boo (1962)
Little Woody Riding Hood (1962)
Greedy Gabby Gator (1963)

References

Film characters introduced in 1958
Fictional crocodilians
Woody Woodpecker
Fictional characters from Florida
Universal Pictures cartoons and characters
Walter Lantz Productions cartoons and characters